Cheng "Frankie" Congfu  (程丛夫; pinyin: Chéng Cóng Fū; born August 15, 1984) is a Chinese racing driver.

Career

Karting
In 1996, Cheng raced in karting in China, winning the national championship in 1998 (junior division), 2000 and 2001. He also took part in the European Karting Open (15th in 1999) and the Asian Karting Championship (runner-up in 2001).

 1996 : 1st in Beijing Shunxiang Cup Karting Competition
 1997 : 1st in Beijing Shunxiang Cup Karting Competition ; 2nd in Beijing Zhuangzhou Karting
 1998 : 1st in Beijing Karting Championship ; 1st in China Karting Championship Junior division ; Macau Kart Racing Club ; 1st in Xiangmihu Kart Racing Club
 1999 : 15th in European Karting Open ; 2nd in China Karting Championship ; 1st in Macao Karting Championship ; 1st in Ericsson Masters Cup Challenge in Hong Kong
 2000 : 1st in China Karting Championship ; 1st in Ericsson Masters Cup Challenge in Hong Kong
 2001 : 1st in All-China Karting Championship ; 2nd in Asia Karting Championship

Racing career
Cheng Congfu started his formula racing career with the British Formula Ford Winter Series in 2001. In 2003 he will be supported by the McLaren Formula One team, as part of its driver development programme.

He joined A1 Team China and drove in the A1 Grand Prix series from the 2006-07 season in the 2008-09 season.

He raced in the Formula Three Euroseries for 2008.

He became the first Chinese driver to participate,  finish and score a class podium in the 24 Hours of Le Mans when his Saulnier Team LMP2 Pescarolo finished 3rd in the LMP2 class of the 2008 event, behind the teams of van Merksteijn and Team Essex, both running Porsche Spyder LMP2s.

On 23–24 May 2009, Cheng Congfu participated in the ADAC Nurburgring 24 Hours, with teammates Altfrid Heger, Carlo van Dam, and Franck Mailleux in VW Motorsport III's #116 VW Scirocco GT 24 (4 cyl, 1.984 ccm, 1100 kg), the team finished 20th overall and 3rd in SP3T class after Volkswagen Motorsport II's #118 VW Scirocco GT 24 and #107 Audi A3. Cheng Congfu then became the first Chinese driver to participate, finish and score a class podium in the Nurburgring 24 Hours.

He drove in the 2010 Deutsche Tourenwagen Masters for Mercedes, becoming the second Asian driver – after Japan's Katsutomo Kaneishi in 2003 – to drive in the series.

In November 2011, Cheng Congfu partnered with 1998 and 1999 F1 World Champion Mika Häkkinen and Lance David Arnold to drive a Mercedes-Benz SLS AMG at the 2011 6 Hours of Zhuhai race, a round of the 2011 Intercontinental Le Mans Cup.

Racing record

Racing career summary

† Guest driver ineligible to score points

‡ Teams' Standings

Complete A1 Grand Prix results
(key) (Races in bold indicate pole position) (Races in italics indicate fastest lap)

Complete DTM results
(key)

24 Hours of Le Mans results

References

External links
 Cheng page at a1teamchina.com.cn
 Driver Statistics at results.a1gp.com
 Career statistic driverdb.com
 Cheng Congfu interview, 17 September 2006

1984 births
Living people
Chinese racing drivers
Asian Formula Renault Challenge drivers
French Formula Renault 2.0 drivers
British Formula Renault 2.0 drivers
A1 Team China drivers
24 Hours of Le Mans drivers
Formula 3 Euro Series drivers
British Formula Three Championship drivers
Deutsche Tourenwagen Masters drivers
Sportspeople from Beijing
American Le Mans Series drivers
FIA World Endurance Championship drivers
Blancpain Endurance Series drivers
24 Hours of Spa drivers
Asian Le Mans Series drivers
High School Affiliated to Renmin University of China alumni
Manor Motorsport drivers
Rebellion Racing drivers
OAK Racing drivers
A1 Grand Prix drivers
Signature Team drivers
RC Motorsport drivers
Performance Racing drivers
Mercedes-AMG Motorsport drivers
Audi Sport drivers
Team Astromega drivers
Nürburgring 24 Hours drivers
Volkswagen Motorsport drivers